These are the results of the 2021 Sarawak state election. The elections was held in Sarawak on 18 December 2021.

Map

Summary

Full result

References 

2021
2021 elections in Malaysia
2021 in Malaysia
Election results in Malaysia